Powder River Rustlers is a 1949 American Western film directed by Philip Ford and written by Richard Wormser. The film stars Allan Lane, Eddy Waller, Gerry Ganzer, Roy Barcroft, Francis McDonald and Cliff Clark. The film was November 25, 1949, by Republic Pictures.

Plot

Cast
Allan Lane as Rocky Lane 
Black Jack as Rocky's Horse
Eddy Waller as Nugget Clark
Gerry Ganzer as Louise Manning
Roy Barcroft as Henchman Bull Macons
Francis McDonald as Shears Williams
Cliff Clark as Lucius Statton
Douglas Evans as Devereaux
Bruce Edwards as Bob Manning
Clarence Straight as Telegraph Operator
Ted Jacques as Blacksmith
Tom Monroe as Guard
Stanley Blystone as Rancher

Comic book adaptation
 Fawcett: Powder River Rustlers (1950)

References

External links 
 

1949 films
American Western (genre) films
1949 Western (genre) films
Republic Pictures films
Films directed by Philip Ford
Films adapted into comics
American black-and-white films
1940s English-language films
1940s American films